The San Pietro Polyptych (Italian: Polittico di San Pietro) is a polyptych by Italian Renaissance master Perugino, painted around 1496–1500. The panels are now in different locations: the lunette and the central panel, depicting the Ascension of Christ, are in the Museum of Fine Arts of Lyon, France.

Description
The polyptych had been originally commissioned for the Abbey of San Pietro at Perugia, the contract having been signed by Perugino on 8 March 1495. It included a large altarpiece and several panels, within a wooden frame by  Domenico da Verona. The altarpiece, depicting the Ascension of Christ, was to have a lunette with the God in Glory between Angels above it, while the predella had not been exactly defined. The payment was 500  golden ducats, and no more than two years and a half were given to complete the work.

The panels were painted between January 1496 and the end of 1499, and the work was solemnly inaugurated on 13 January 1500. Contemporary art historian Giorgio Vasari considered the predella Perugino's best work in his home city.

In 1591 the church's choir was radically restored, and the altar had to be dismantled. After the religious suppressions of 1797, the work was acquired by the French, and was divided into several French museums, although several panels remained in Perugia or went to Papal collections in Rome.

Description
The cymatium was separated by the main panel by a frame, in the same way of the Vallombrosa Altarpiece. At the sides were two columns which supported the frame arch and which, at the bases, were decorated by three small panels with Saints, sharing the same background.

The polyptych included the following panels:

Ascension (280 × 216 cm), now at the Museum of Fine Arts of Lyon. This work was almost entirely copied by Perugino and his workshop for the later Sansepolcro Altarpiece. The Vallombrosa Altarpiece also used a similar composition, in turn inspired by the now lost Assumption in the Sistine Chapel.
God in Glory lunette (114 × 230 cm), now at the Museum of Fine Arts of Lyon. It represents God in a cloud in the sky, surrounded by cherubims and seraphims, and two symmetrical angels at the side.
Tondoes of Jeremy and Isaiah (both 127 cm in diameter), now at the Musée des beaux-arts of Nantes
Adoration of the Magi (predella panel, 32 × 59 cm). Now at the Musée des Beaux-Arts of Rouen.
Baptism of Christ (predella panel, 32 × 59 cm). Now at the Musée des Beaux-Arts of Rouen.
Resurrection (predella panel, 32 × 59 cm). Now at the Musée des Beaux-Arts of Rouen.
St. Herculanus and St. Constantius (predella panels, 32 × 38 cm). Now at the Galleria Nazionale dell'Umbria at  Perugia.
St. Maurus, St. Peter ad Vincula, St. Scholastica, St. Benedict, St. Flavia and St. Placidus (panels at the columns base, various sizes). Now at the Galleria Nazionale dell'Umbria at  Perugia and the Pinacoteca Vaticana in Rome.

Sources

 Musée des Beaux-Arts de Lyon

1490s paintings
Paintings by Pietro Perugino
Paintings depicting Jesus
Paintings of the Virgin Mary
Angels in art
Musical instruments in art
Polyptychs
Paintings in the collection of the Museum of Fine Arts of Lyon
Paintings in the collection of the Musée d'Arts de Nantes
Perug